The following is a list of programs that have been broadcast by the TeenNick cable channel. It was launched as a merge of two former teen-oriented programming blocks: TEENick on Nickelodeon and The N on Noggin. The channel still airs reruns of shows that originated on the TEENick block (such as iCarly), but as of the mid-2010s, all original productions from the Noggin block have been dropped.

TeenNick's lineup primarily features reruns of programming that had aired on the main Nickelodeon channel.

Current programming

Programming from Nickelodeon

Live-action

Acquired programming

Live-action

Former programming

TeenNick

Original programming

Reality series

Drama series

Comedy series

Music series

Animated series

Programming from Nickelodeon
An asterisk (*) indicates that the program had new episodes aired on TeenNick.

Live-action

Game shows

Educational series

Animated ("Nicktoons")

Programming from Nick at Nite

Programming from MTV

Acquired programming

Live-action

Animated

Specials

NickRewind

Original programming

Programming from Nickelodeon

Live-action

Animated ("Nicktoons")

Acquired programming

Online programming

Films

See also
 List of programs broadcast by Noggin
 List of programs broadcast by Nickelodeon
 List of programs broadcast by Nick at Nite
 List of programs broadcast by Nick Jr.
 List of programs broadcast by Nicktoons
 List of Nickelodeon original films
 TeenNick

References

TeenNick
Nickelodeon-related lists